Bergerac is a subprefecture of the Dordogne department, in the region of Nouvelle-Aquitaine, Southwestern France. In 2018, the  commune had a population of 26,823, which made it the department's second-most populated after the prefecture Périgueux. Located on the banks of the river Dordogne, Bergerac was designated a Town of Art and History by the Ministry of Culture in 2013.

History
In 1565, Charles IX of France visited Bergerac during his grand tour.

On 17 September 1577, amidst the French Wars of Religion, the Treaty of Bergerac, also known as the Peace of Bergerac (French: Paix de Bergerac), was signed between Henri III of France and Protestants to put a temporary end to the conflict. The treaty was negotiated by important figures on each side of the conflict, namely Nicolas de Neufville, seigneur de Villeroy and Armand de Gontaut, baron de Biron on the King's side and François de la Noue and François, Duke of Montpensier on the Protestant side.

Bergerac, which was a site where members of the French Resistance in Dordogne were incarcerated and interrogated during World War II, was freed from German occupation on 21 August 1944.

Demographics

Climate

Economy

The region is primarily known for wine and tobacco. It has twelve recognised wine AOCs (appellations d'origine contrôlée):

 Bergerac
 Bergerac Rosé
 Bergerac Sec (dry)
 Côtes-de-Bergerac
 Côtes de Bergerac Blanc
 Côtes de Montravel
 Montravel (red and white)
 Haut-Montravel
 Saussignac
 Monbazillac
 Pécharmant
 Rosette

Immigration
Bergerac is home to a population of British people who frequently identify as 'expats' rather than immigrants. This trend is not unique to Bergerac and is evident throughout the Dordogne. In part, this is driven by house prices which are very affordable when compared with either the French or British national averages. The increasing British presence has led to some integration initiatives such as the non-profit Université du Temps Libre which offers French language classes and a programme of cultural activities.

Tourism
The town has a growing tourism industry. The region's association with wines is also a key motivating factor for much tourism with wine tours, chateau visits and a wine house by the river which features an exhibition on the history of wine growing. Nearby sites for tourists include the Arboretum de Podestat, Château de Monbazillac, the town museum, statue museum, and tobacco museum. The church of Notre Dame is located in the town centre. The Dordogne River is also a significant tourist attraction for river boat tours and kayak rental.

Cyrano de Bergerac

The town contains two statues of Cyrano de Bergerac, subject of a famous eponymous play by Edmond Rostand. An old stone statue stands on Place de la Myrpe, facing Place du Docteur Cayla.  A newer statue, painted in colour and standing on a stainless steel pedestal, has been erected on Place Pelissiere.

Transport

Bergerac is served by Bergerac-Roumanière Airport (code EGC), which has internal flights, as well as routes to UK airports including Southampton, Bristol, Manchester, East Midlands, London Luton, Edinburgh, Exeter, Liverpool, Birmingham, Leeds Bradford and London Stansted Airport. Transavia also flies to Bergerac from Amsterdam.

Bergerac has an SNCF station with regular services to Bordeaux and Sarlat-la-Canéda. A weekday bus service operates between Bergerac and Périgueux, mainly serving school commuters.

Education
Bergerac is located within the Bordeaux Académie, which covers the entire former Aquitaine region. The main high school is Lycée Maine de Biran. Other high schools in the town include the private school Institution Sainte-Marthe Saint-Front, Lycée Jean Capelle and Lycée Professionnel de l'Alba.

International relations

Bergerac, Dordogne is twinned with:

 Repentigny, Canada, since 1997
 Faenza, Italy, since 1998
 Kenitra, Morocco, since 2016
 Ostrów Wielkopolski, Poland, since 2017
 Hohen Neuendorf, Germany, since 2018

Popular Culture
Bergerac is the setting of the ROBLOX game 'FIELDS OF GASCONY', published 8/24/2020, it is a part of the Hundred Years' War group, owned by HYWGenre. Currently, the game has over 1m visits.

See also
 Communes of the Dordogne department
 Elias Burneti of Bergerac

References

External links

 
 Bergerac airport

Communes of Dordogne
Dordogne communes articles needing translation from French Wikipedia
Périgord
Subprefectures in France